was a Japanese daimyō of the early Edo period.

Early life
His childhood name was Shintarō (新太郎).He was the son of Ikeda Toshitaka with Tsuruhime, daughter of Sakakibara Yasumasa and adopted daughter of Tokugawa Hidetada.He married Katsuhime, daughter of Honda Tadatoki with Senhime who was daughter of Tokugawa Hidetada with Oeyo and Tokugawa Ieyasu's favorite granddaughter.

Family
 Father: Ikeda Toshitaka (1584-1616)
 Mother: Tsuruhime (d.1672)
 Wife: Katsuhime (1618-1678)
 Concubines:
 Mizuno Katsunoshin's daughter
 Okuni no Kata
 Children:
 Ikeda Tsunamasa by Katsuhime
 Jiunin married Honda Tadahira by Katsuhime
 Seigen’in (1636-1717) married Ichijo Norisuke by Katsuhime
 Daughter married Sakakibara Masafusa by Katsuhime
 daughter married Nakagawa Hisatsune by Katsuhime
 Ikeda Masakoto (1645-1700) by Mizuno Katsunoshin's daughter
 Ikeda Terutoshi (1649-1714) by Okuni no Kata
 Rokuhime (1645-1680) married Ikeda Yoshisada latre married Takikawa Kazumune by Okuni no Kata
 Shichihime (1647-1652) by Okuni no Kata
 Kiyohime (1653-1686) married Mori Moritsuna by Okuni no Kata
 daughter (1657-1662) by Okuni no Kata

Daimyo
After his father's death in 1616, Mitsumasa inherited his father's domains in Harima Province.

In 1617, he was transferred to Tottori Domain (325,000 koku) with Inaba Province and Hōki Province as fiefs.

In 1632, he was transferred to Okayama Domain (315,000 koku) at Bizen.  His descendants continued to live at Okayama.

He was also a Confucian scholar, and was a patron of Kumazawa Banzan, 17th century Confucian scholar.

References

Further reading
Takekoshi Yosaburō (1930). The Economic Aspects of the History of the Civilization of Japan (New York: The Macmillan Company), p. 193.

|-

|-

1609 births
1682 deaths
Daimyo
Japanese philosophers
Ikeda clan
Japanese Confucianists
Deified Japanese people